The Miss Ecuador 2000 was held on April 6, 2000. There were 11 candidates for the national title; in the end of the night Carolina Alfonso from Pichincha crowned to Gabriela Cadena from Guayas as Miss Ecuador 2000. The Miss Ecuador compete at Miss Universe 2000.

Results

Placements

Special awards

Contestants

Notes

Withdraws

 Bolívar
 Cañar
 Chimborazo
 Cotopaxi
 Galápagos
 Los Ríos
 Napo
 Pastaza
 Tungurahua

Did Not Compete

 Esmeraldas - Lizbeth Mosquera Márquez
 Loja - Raquel Vélez Reinoso

External links
https://web.archive.org/web/20120725044759/http://www.missecuador.net/home/index.php?option=com_content&task=view&id=88&Itemid=52

http://www.explored.com.ec/noticias-ecuador/hoy-eligen-a-miss-ecuador-2000-97566-97566.html
http://www.geocities.ws/fotitos2000/Nomina.html

Miss Ecuador
2000 beauty pageants
Beauty pageants in Ecuador
2000 in Ecuador